Colm Daly is an Irish chess player and FIDE Master (FM).

He became Irish national champion six times, sometimes in a tie with another player, in 1998, 1999, 2005 (scoring 8/9), 2009, 2012 and 2013.

In September 2015, he won the City of Dublin tournament with 4 points in  5 rounds.

References

British chess players
Irish chess players
Chess FIDE Masters
1967 births
Living people